Alfred R. Zariwny (born February 3, 1944) is a Canadian former politician who served as a member of the Legislative Assembly of Alberta from 1993 to 1997.  Under the banner of the Liberal Party, he defeated New Democrat MLA Barrie Chivers in the riding of Edmonton-Strathcona. He declined to run for a second term in office and retired at dissolution of the legislature in 1997.

References

External links

Alberta Liberal Party MLAs
Living people
1944 births
People from Thorhild County